Jason Larue Gildon (born July 31, 1972) is a former  outside linebacker for the National Football League's Pittsburgh Steelers (1994–2003) and Jacksonville Jaguars (2004). He was selected to three Pro Bowl teams from 2000, 2001, and 2002, and is currently ranked sixth in Steelers all-time career sacks with 77.

College career
Gildon is an Oklahoma State University alum.

Professional career

Gildon played a large role on the Steelers special teams unit during his first two years before being inserted into the starting lineup in 1996, after All-Pro pass-rusher Greg Lloyd, Sr. went down in the season opener with a torn knee ligament. Gildon turned in 7.0 sacks in 1996.

1997 saw Gildon lineup opposite Lloyd after returning and recorded 5.0 sacks, 53 tackles, 12 passes defensed, and 1 defensive touchdown. Gildon was most remembered in 1997 for recovering a Drew Bledsoe fumble late into the Steelers 1997 Divisional Playoff match-up against the New England Patriots; the Steelers would win this game 7-6 thanks to Gildon securing the ball, preventing a possible Patriots field goal or touchdown.

Over the course of the 1998 and 1999 seasons, Gildon would rack up a total of 19.5 sacks and 109 tackles.

The 2000 Steelers season was Gildon's break-out year. He would amass 13.5 sacks, 75 tackles, and 1 defensive touchdown, and was the anchor of a Steelers defense that helped the team record its first winning season in three years. Now teamed up with young outside linebacker Joey Porter, many speculated that the Steelers had their best pair of pass-rushing linebackers since Lloyd and Kevin Greene from the mid-90s. Gildon capped off an impressive season with his first Pro Bowl berth.

In 2001, the Steelers finally made their way back to the playoffs and Gildon kept up his charge. He would record 12.0 sacks, score his third career defensive touchdown, and pull down his first career interception against the Cincinnati Bengals. He was named to his second Pro-Bowl, but his dreams and that of the Steelers' of getting to the Super Bowl were erased after a defeat to the Patriots in the 2001 AFC Championship Game.

Gildon made his third and final Pro Bowl team in 2002 while his numbers decreased a bit. He had 9.0 sacks, his lowest total since 1999. Gildon had reached age 30 while Porter finished 2002 as the Steelers co-MVP and new defensive leader.

2003 was Gildon's last season with the Steelers, who had finished the year 6-10. He started the season with 71.0, needing just 3.0 sacks to pass L. C. Greenwood. During a game against the Arizona Cardinals, Gildon brought the home crowd to its feet one last time when he sacked Cardinals quarterback Jeff Blake in the third quarter to surpass Greenwood.

Gildon was a member of the Buffalo Bills during the 2004 training camp, but he was cut two weeks into camp. Midway through the 2004 season, the Jacksonville Jaguars signed Gildon to their roster, who needed help at defensive end. Gildon contributed 3.0 sacks, including one against his former team on December 5, 2004.

For his career, Gildon finished with 80.0 sacks, 520 tackles, 44 passes defensed, 2 interceptions, and 3 defensive touchdowns.

Post-NFL career
After his professional football career ended, Gildon went into coaching. He was an assistant coach at Seneca Valley and Peters Township, near Pittsburgh.
In Feb. 2015, he beat out 40 applicants from 10 states and became the head football coach at Cardinal Wuerl North Catholic HS in a Pittsburgh suburb. He left that position in December 2016 after two seasons and a record of 17-6 overall.

Personal life
Gildon is the older brother of former Tennessee Titans defensive end Larry Birdine.

NFL stats

References

1972 births
Living people
American football linebackers
American football defensive ends
Oklahoma State Cowboys football players
Pittsburgh Steelers players
American Conference Pro Bowl players
Jacksonville Jaguars players
Players of American football from Oklahoma
People from Altus, Oklahoma